Vahed (also Romanized as Vāḩed) is a village in Kelardasht-e Sharqi Rural District, Kelardasht District, Chalus County, Mazandaran Province, Iran. At the 2006 census, its population was 621, in 168 families.

References 

Populated places in Chalus County